Buzz is a nickname. Notable people with the name include:

Buzz Aldrin (born 1930), American pilot and astronaut, second person to set foot on the Moon
Herbert Altshuler (born 1945), American retired major general
Buzz Arlett (1899–1964), American baseball player
James D. Beans (born 1934), United States Marine Corps brigadier general
George Beurling (1921–1948), Canadian World War II fighter pilot
Buzz Bissinger (born 1954), American Pulitzer Prize-winning journalist and author
 Buzz Burrell (born 1951) American ultrarunner 
Ian Burrows (1930–2006), New Zealand brigadier general and Commander of Land Forces New Zealand
Steve Busby (born 1949), American baseball pitcher
Frank Carrone (1938–1975), American mobster
Beau Casson (born 1982), Australian former cricketer
Buzz Clifford (1941–2018), American singer
Charlie Eckert (1897–1986), American baseball pitcher
Buzz Fazio (1908–1993), American bowler
Buzz Feiten, American singer, songwriter and guitarist
Buzz Gardner (1931–2004), American trumpeter
Buzz Grogan, a professional wrestler with NWA: All-Star Wrestling
Buzz Hargrove (born 1944), former national president of the Canadian Auto Workers trade union
John McClung (1935–2004), Canadian historian, lawyer, jurist and judge
Buzz Nutter (1931–2008), American football player
Buzz Osborne (born 1964), guitarist/vocalist/songwriter, founding member of The Melvins
Buzz Parsons (born 1950), Canadian former soccer player
Buzz Peterson (born 1963), American basketball player, coach and executive
Buzz Schneider (born 1954), American ice hockey player and Olympic gold medalist
Boyd Wagner (1918–1942), American World War II flying ace and lieutenant colonel
Buzz Williams (born 1972), American college men's basketball head coach at Virginia Tech
Raymond R. Wright (1945–1999), US Army soldier and Medal of Honor recipient

See also 
 Buzzy (disambiguation), includes a list of people with name Buzzy

Lists of people by nickname